Pierre Mpozenzi (born circa 1937) was a Burundian politician. He served as Vice Prime Minister of Burundi from April 1964 to June 1965.

Early life 
Pierre Mpozenzi was born in about 1937. A part of the Abajiji clan, he was ethnically Hutu. Educated in agriculture at the Groupe Scolaire d'Astrida, he later became Provincial Administrator of Bujumbura Province.

Political career 
Mpozenzi had close relations with the Mwami of Burundi, Mwambutsa IV of Burundi, and was one of the few Hutus who aligned with the Casablanca faction in the Burundian National Assembly. He served as a division director in the Ministry of Agriculture from March 1962 until mid-1963, when he was appointed Governor of Ruyigi Province. From 1963 until April 1964 he served as the Master of Ceremonies for the Royal Court. In April 1964 he became Vice Prime Minister and Minister Interior of Burundi under Prime Minister Albin Nyamoya. In August he declared that all persons who sought to aid Prime Minister Moïse Tshombe of the Democratic Republic of the Congo would be barred from Burundi. Mpozenzi was dismissed from the vice premiership in June 1965 but remained Minister of Interior until he was replaced in October. The following month he was made Minister of Economy, and held the position until July 1966. On 14 November 1967 President Michel Micombero appointed him Minister of Interior.

References

Works cited 
 
 
 
 

Interior ministers of Burundi
Hutu people

1930s births
Year of birth uncertain
Possibly living people